Sylvester's theorem or the Sylvester theorem may refer to any of several theorems named after James Joseph Sylvester:
 The Sylvester–Gallai theorem, on the existence of a line with only two of n given points.
 Sylvester's determinant identity.
 Sylvester's matrix theorem, also called Sylvester's formula, for a matrix function in terms of eigenvalues.
 Sylvester's law of inertia, also called Sylvester's rigidity theorem, about the signature of a quadratic form.
 Sylvester's theorem on the product of k consecutive integers > k, that generalizes Bertrand's postulate.
 Sylvester's theorem on partitions.
 Sylvester theorem on spherical harmonics.
 Sylvester's criterion, a characterization of positive-definite Hermitian matrices.
 Sylvester’s inequality about the rank (linear algebra) of the product of two matrices.
 Sylvester's closed solution for the Frobenius coin problem when there are only two coins.
 Sylvester's triangle problem, a particular geometric representation of the sum of three vectors of equal length
The Weinstein–Aronszajn identity, stating that det(I + AB) = det(I + BA), for matrices A, B, is sometimes attributed to Sylvester.

See also
List of topics named after James Joseph Sylvester